Héctor Larios Córdova (born 22 December 1954) is a Mexican politician affiliated with the PAN. He currently serves as Senator of the LXII Legislature of the Mexican Congress. He also served as Senator during the LVIII and LIX Legislatures and as Deputy in the LVII and LX Legislatures, as well as a local deputy in the Congress of Sonora.

References

1954 births
Living people
Politicians from Guadalajara, Jalisco
Members of the Senate of the Republic (Mexico)
Members of the Chamber of Deputies (Mexico)
National Action Party (Mexico) politicians
20th-century Mexican politicians
21st-century Mexican politicians
Members of the Congress of Sonora